Andrew William Playfair (1790 – September 1868) was a politician in Canada West.

Playfair was born in Paris, France in 1790, the son of William Playfair. He served in the British Army and later settled near Perth, Ontario. He built a number of mills which formed the basis of the community of Playfairville on the Mississippi River northwest of Perth. He was elected to the Legislative Assembly of the Province of Canada for the South riding of Lanark in 1857. Playfair served as colonel in the local militia. He died in Playfairville in 1868.

External links 
Early Days of Methodism in Perth transcribed by Lanark County Genealogical Society

1790 births
1868 deaths
Members of the Legislative Assembly of the Province of Canada from Canada West
Canadian Methodists